Vesko Mihajlović (Serbian Cyrillic: Веско Михајловић; born 17 March 1968) is a Serbian former football midfielder and manager. He is widely considered to be one of the best foreign players to have played in the Cypriot Championship. He became a Cypriot citizen in 2002.

Career
During his playing career he represented FK Sloga Kraljevo, FK Proleter Zrenjanin, FK Vojvodina in Serbia and APOEL, Enosis Neon Paralimni, Olympiakos Nicosia, Anorthosis and Omonia in Cyprus.

Mihajlović scored three goals in 18 Yugoslav Second League matches for Proleter during the 1989–90 season, and led the team in scoring with ten goals in 31 Yugoslav First League matches during the 1990–91 season.

He was an excellent attacking midfielder and skilled at free kicks. During his tenure with Omonia he struck a partnership with Rainer Rauffmann. Together they led Omonia to 2 championship titles and 1 cup win. He had previously won 2 championship titles and a cup with Anorthosis.

During his final season with Omonia (2004–2005) he was put in charge as player/manager for the club. However after a few months he decided to step down and return to his former role with Henk Houwaart replaced him.

His final match was at the 2004–2005 Cypriot Cup final in which Omonia defeated Digenis Morphou 2–0. As a gesture of appreciation for his services to the club he was brought on as a substitute and also lifted the trophy with Costas Kaiafas. He was 37 years old at the time.

He was director of football for AC Omonia for three years before moving on to the same role for Alki Larnaca. On 8 April 2016 he was announced as new manager of ASIL Lysi. In March 2018 he took over as manager of Olympiakos Nicosia.

Honours
 First League of FR Yugoslavia top-scorer: 1992–93
 Cypriot Championship (4): 1998, 1999, 2001, 2003
 Cypriot Cup (3): 1998, 2000, 2005
 Cyprus FA Shield (3): 1998, 2001, 2003

References

External links
 

1968 births
Living people
Sportspeople from Kraljevo
Serbian footballers
Serbian expatriate footballers
FK Sloga Kraljevo players
FK Vojvodina players
APOEL FC players
Enosis Neon Paralimni FC players
Olympiakos Nicosia players
Anorthosis Famagusta F.C. players
AC Omonia players
Cypriot First Division players
Serbian football managers
AC Omonia managers
Expatriate footballers in Cyprus
Association football midfielders
Association football forwards